Kim Terrell (born 18 October 1962) is an Australian swimmer. He competed in the men's 200 metre backstroke at the 1984 Summer Olympics.

References

External links
 

1962 births
Living people
Australian male backstroke swimmers
Olympic swimmers of Australia
Swimmers at the 1984 Summer Olympics
Place of birth missing (living people)